Michelle Sechser (born November 1, 1986) is an American rower. She competed in the women's lightweight double sculls event at the 2020 Summer Olympics.

She won the bronze medal in both the women's lightweight double sculls and women's quadruple sculls events at the 2011 Pan American Games held in Guadalajara, Mexico. In 2015, Sechser won a bronze medal at World Cup II in the LW2x in Lucerne, Switzerland. Sechser went on to win a bronze medal at the 2017 World Rowing Championships in the LW2x in Sarasota, Florida. Sechser also rowed for the USA National Team in 2011-15 and 2017-2021.

References

External links
 
 Tulsa Golden Hurricane bio

1986 births
Living people
American female rowers
Rowers at the 2011 Pan American Games
Medalists at the 2011 Pan American Games
Pan American Games bronze medalists for the United States
Pan American Games medalists in rowing
Olympic rowers of the United States
Rowers at the 2020 Summer Olympics
People from San Luis Obispo, California
Sportspeople from California
Tulsa Golden Hurricane athletes
College women's rowers in the United States
21st-century American women
World Rowing Championships medalists for the United States